The South Sudan Premier League is on the second level of the football pyramid in South Sudan after the South Sudan Football Championship. The first season started in 2013 after the independence of South Sudan.

Clubs

2014

Champions
2013 – Central Equatoria United F.C
2014 – Central Equatoria United F.C

Performance by club

Football leagues in South Sudan
Top level football leagues in Africa
Sports leagues established in 2013
2013 establishments in South Sudan